Aquarela do Brasil is a studio album by American singer Dionne Warwick. It was released by Arista Records on October 18, 1994 in the United States. A collection of Brazilian jazz and pop tunes, ranging from bossa nova to samba, the album consists of original songs as well as several cover versions, including standards such as "Caravan" and its title track. Warwick paried herself with Téo Lima to produce the entire album which was recorded in Brazil and Los Angeles, involving help from Dori Caymmi, Oscar Castro-Neves, Brenda Russell, and Patrick Williams, among others.

Background
In 1993, Arista Records released Warwick's Friends Can Be Lovers, her tenth album with the label. A commercial flop, it reached number 82 on the US Top R&B/Hip-Hop Albums only. The same year, Warwick bought an old Spanishstyle castle in Bahia in the northeast of Brazil and began recording her next project, a collection of Brazilian jazz and pop tunes, with producer Téo Lima. Unlike her previous project, which she "hated," Warwick enjoyed the album recordings for Aquarela do Brasil, during which she was coached by her background singer Eliana Estevao in Portuguese pronunciation. While the rhythm tracks and vocals were in finished in Brazil, Lima flew to Los Angeles where the strings, horns, and backgrounds were recorded and arrangers Dori Caymmi, Oscar Castro-Neves, Brenda Russell, and Patrick Williams joined the team.

Critical reception

Allmusic wrote that "wisely downplaying the overexposed standards, Warwick sings, in both English and Portuguese, with just the right amount of swing and ease. The gorgeous title track is a sublime highlight, as is an intriguing cover of Juan Tizol and Duke Ellington's massively influential "Caravan." The arrangements are a little fussy at times, but overall, this is one of the best Brazilian crossover discs of its era." The St. Louis Post-Dispatch called Aquarela do Brasil "Warwick's musical statement for the '90s. Who would have expected she could pull off such a diverse piece of work after making a career out of middle-of-the-road pop ballads [...]." The Rolling Stone Album Guide found that Aquarela do Brasil turns Warwick "loose on an excellent, and apt, set of bossa nova tunes."

Commercial performance
Aquarela do Brasil failed to chart or sell noticeably and became Warwick's first album since Love at First Sight (1977), her final album with Warner Bros. Records, to miss any Billboard chart. Disappointed with its commercial performance, Warwick attributed its low sales to Arista Records' promotion team and label head Clive Davis' lack of support. In her 2011 autobiography My Life, As I See It, Warwick wrote that she regretted not having played a larger part in the promotion of Aquarela do Brasil. With Arista going through internal changes then, she left the label shortly after the release of the album, making it her final project with Davis.

Track listing
All tracks produced by Teo Lima.
Credits lifted from the liner notes of Aquarela do Brasil.

Notes
 "Jobim Medley" consists of "Retrato Em Branco E Preto" / "How Insensitive", "Quiet Nights Of Quiet Stars", "Wave", and "Waters of March"
 All Déjà Vu – The Arista Recordings (2020) bonus tracks had previously been released on Warwick's Tropical Love EP (2015).

References

Dionne Warwick albums
1994 albums
Arista Records albums